Bjørn Andreas Bull-Hansen (born 18 August 1972) is a Norwegian blogger, novelist, screenwriter, conspiracy theorist and YouTuber.

Early life and education 
Bull-Hansen was born in Oslo, Norway, on 18 August 1972. He was pursuing an economics master's degree at BI Norwegian Business School but was unable to complete this due to an injury suffered from a car accident on 22 December 1995.

Before his career as a novelist, he was a therapist.

Sporting career 
Bull-Hansen started lifting weights at the age of 13 and soon turned professional. He won several prizes in powerlifting, including two gold medals in the Norwegian Powerlifting Championship, a bronze medal in the European Championship, and fifth place in the world, as well as several Norwegian records. He continued his powerlifting career some years after a car accident, and competed in the Classic World Cup 2012 at the age of 40, as part of the Norwegian national team, and placed 10th.

He is a lifetime drug-free athlete and has often been a spokesman for drug-free sports. He is also very fond of ocean sailing, kayaking and historic archery.

Novelist career 
After ending his sporting career, Bull-Hansen started writing novels, finishing the manuscript for his debut novel, Syv historier fra Vestskogen (Seven Tales of the Western Forest), which he had been working sporadically for six years. He has since written about one book per year, and is widely read in his native Norway.

The stories in Bull-Hansen's novels tend to be set in hostile environments, and he has written both from Iron Age settings and from a post-apocalyptic world. His characters are often troubled and it is easy to see that Bull-Hansen's experience working with people shines through in his novels.

Jomsviking Series 
In 2017, Bull-Hansen published the first of a historical novel, Jomsviking. The book was an immediate hit, with two more books published in 2018 and 2019, respectively. The series has been translated into several languages, them being Bulgarian, Danish, Dutch, German, Norwegian, Polish and Swedish. The series is also being translated into Hungarian, Russian and Spanish. A petition has been created to get the series published in English.

YouTube 
In January 2016, Bull-Hansen created his YouTube account. He posts videos about Viking culture, bushcraft and various other topics in the form of vlogs. As of 4 March 2021, he has 451,000 subscribers and 29.5 million views.

Published works

Syv historier fra Vestskogen (Seven Tales of the Western Forest) (1996)
Dragens tårer (Tears of the Dragon) (1997) 
Brans reise(The Voyage of Bran) (1998) 
Han Som Søker (He Who Seeks) (1999) 
Cernunnos' komme (The Coming of Cernunnos) (2000) 
Profetier - memoarer om John Thiersen (Prophecies - memoires concerning John Thiersen) (2000) 
Der gudene dør (Where Gods Die) (2001) 
Tazka Kora (2002)
Lushons plater (Lushon's Slates) (2004) 
Anubis (2006) 
Evercity (2007) 
Den røde oksen (The Red Ox) (2008) 
Jotnens hjemkomst (The Return of The Jotun) (2010) 
Før de ni verdener styrter (Before the Nine Worlds End) (2011) 
Ragnarok (Ragnarok) (2012) 
Isak (Isak) (2015) 
Jomsviking (2017) 
Jomsviking II (Vinland) (2018) 
Jomsviking III (Danehæren) (2019) 
Jomsviking IV (Danelovs land) (2021)

References

External links
Official website

1972 births
Living people
Norwegian male writers
Norwegian YouTubers
Norwegian bloggers